Donald Cecil Porter (September 24, 1912 – February 11, 1997) was an American stage, film, and television actor.

On television, he played Peter Sands, the boss of Ann Sothern's character on Private Secretary, and Russell Lawrence, the widowed father of 15-year-old Frances "Gidget" Lawrence (Sally Field) in the 1965 ABC sitcom Gidget.

Life and career
Porter was born in Miami, Oklahoma, and as a youth also lived in Nebraska and Oregon. He joined the Oklahoma National Guard at the age of 14, claiming to be 18, and was commissioned a lieutenant. He served as a combat photographer during World War II and also appeared in training films.

Porter's first roles as an actor began when he was 17, playing dramatic parts on the radio. In 1936, he appeared on stage in Portland in Maxwell Anderson's Elizabeth the Queen. He went on to appear in more than 200 plays. His Broadway credits include The Front Page (1968), Plaza Suite (1967), and Any Wednesday (1963).

He appeared in various films in the 1940s before landing the role of Peter Sands, the boss of Susan Camille MacNamara (Ann Sothern), on the 1950s sitcom Private Secretary. A retooled version of the series appeared later, titled The Ann Sothern Show. It featured many of the same actors, including Porter as hotel manager James Devery in the venue of a fashionable New York City hotel. He later guest-starred on episodes of Green Acres, Love, American Style, The Mod Squad, Barnaby Jones, The Six Million Dollar Man, Hawaii Five-O, Three's Company (on which he played Jack Tripper's uncle), and Switch. Porter also had a lucrative stage career that included the long-running hit Any Wednesday (1964) opposite Sandy Dennis and Gene Hackman.

Porter also appeared in numerous films, including The Turning Point (1952), Our Miss Brooks (1956), Gidget Goes to Rome (playing Russell Lawrence two years prior to repeating the role in the series), and Live a Little, Love a Little (1968) starring with Elvis Presley. 

In The Candidate (1972), he played Crocker Jarmon, a ruthless, corrupt United States Senator being challenged by a character played by Robert Redford. Commenting on a scene in which Jarmon gave a stirring speech with feigned sincerity, the New Statesman observed that Porter gave "a beautiful performance of Jarman giving a beautiful performance."

Porter played Mr. Upson in the 1974 film adaptation of Mame with Lucille Ball and Bea Arthur. Porter made his last onscreen appearance in a 1988 episode of CBS Summer Playhouse.

Personal life and death
Porter was married to actress Peggy Converse with whom he had two children. He died at age 84 in his Beverly Hills, California home on February 11, 1997.

Filmography

Film

Television

Awards and honors

References

External links

 
 
 
 

1912 births
1997 deaths
People from Miami, Oklahoma
Male actors from Oklahoma
American male film actors
American male television actors
American male stage actors
United States Army Air Forces soldiers
First Motion Picture Unit personnel
20th-century American male actors